Grazhdansky (Graždanskər) is a rural locality (a khutor) in Krasnoulskoye Rural Settlement of Maykopsky District, Russia. The population was 379 as of 2018. There are three streets.

Geography 
Kalinin is the nearest rural locality.

References 

Rural localities in Maykopsky District